Waltz Township is one of seven townships in Wabash County, Indiana, United States. As of the 2010 census, its population was 1,287 and it contained 572 housing units.

Geography

Unincorporated towns
 College Corner at 
 Mount Vernon at 
 Somerset at 
(This list is based on USGS data and may include former settlements.)

Adjacent townships
 Noble Township (north)
 Liberty Township (east)
 Pleasant Township, Grant County (southeast)
 Richland Township, Grant County (southeast)
 Harrison Township, Miami County (southwest)
 Jackson Township, Miami County (southwest)
 Butler Township, Miami County (west)

Cemeteries
The township contains these four cemeteries: Mississinewa Memorial, Mount Pleasant, North Union and Slocum.

School districts
 Metropolitan School District of Wabash County Schools

Political districts
 Indiana's 5th congressional district
 State House District 22
 State Senate District 17

References
 United States Census Bureau 2007 TIGER/Line Shapefiles
 United States Board on Geographic Names (GNIS)
 IndianaMap

External links
 Indiana Township Association
 United Township Association of Indiana

Townships in Wabash County, Indiana
Townships in Indiana